The 1973 Craven International Championships, was a men's tennis tournament played on outdoor clay courts at the Nice Lawn Tennis Club in Nice, France that was part of the Rothmans Spring Mediterranean Circuit. It was the third edition of the tournament and was held from 9 April until 15 April 1973. Manuel Orantes won the title and earned $4,000 first-prize money.

Finals

Singles
 Manuel Orantes defeated  Adriano Panatta 7–6, 5–7, 4–6, 7–6, 12–10
 It was Orantes' 2nd singles title of the year and the 12th of his career.

Doubles
 Manuel Orantes /  Juan Gisbert Sr. defeated  Patrice Beust /  Daniel Contet 7–5, 6–1

References

Craven International Championships
1973
Craven International Championships
Craven International Championships
20th century in Nice